Mesorhizobium sangaii is a bacterium from the genus Mesorhizobium which was isolated from root nodules of Astragalus luteolus and Astragalus ernestii in the Sichuan Province in China.

References

External links
Type strain of Mesorhizobium sangaii at BacDive -  the Bacterial Diversity Metadatabase

Phyllobacteriaceae
Bacteria described in 2013